Astride Palata (born 14 November 1982) is a Congolese handball player. She plays for the club Primeiro de Agosto and is member of the DR Congo national team. She competed at the 2015 World Women's Handball Championship in Denmark.

References

1982 births
Living people
Democratic Republic of the Congo female handball players
Democratic Republic of the Congo expatriates in Angola
21st-century Democratic Republic of the Congo people